The Kerala State Film Award for Best Actor is an honour, begun in 1969, presented annually at the Kerala State Film Awards of India to an actor for best performance in a Malayalam film. Until 1997, the awards were managed directly by the Department of Cultural Affairs of the Government of Kerala. Since 1998, the awards have been constituted by the Kerala State Chalachitra Academy, an autonomous, non-profit institution functioning under the Department of Cultural Affairs. The awardees are decided by an independent jury constituted every year. They are announced by the Minister for Cultural Affairs and are presented by the Chief Minister.

Throughout the years, accounting for ties and repeat winners, the Government of Kerala has presented a total of 55 Best Actor awards to 32 different actors. Several actors have won the honour for more than one film in a given year. As of 2020, the only actor to have won the prize in consecutive years is Bharat Gopy, in 1982 and 1983.

The first Kerala State film Awards ceremony was held in 1970 with Sathyan receiving the award for Kadalpalam (1969). In 1981, Nedumudi Venu received the honour for his performance in various films released that year. As of 2020, Mohanlal is the most honoured actor with six awards, followed by Mammootty with five. Two actorsBharat Gopy and Muralihave won the award four times. Prithviraj Sukumaran is the youngest recipient at age 24 for Vaasthavam (2006); he replaced Mohanlal, who held this distinction for twenty years from 1986. There were four years when there was a tie for the winnerRajit Kapur and Murali shared the honour in 1998, Fahadh Faasil and Lal in 2013, Nivin Pauly and Sudev Nair in 2014, Jayasurya and Soubin Shahir in 2018 and the most recent winners Biju Menon and Joju George in 2021.

Superlatives

Winners

Notes

References

External links
 Official website
 Department of Cultural Affairs
 Department of Information and Public Relations: Awardees list

Kerala State Film Awards
Film awards for lead actor